Wilfred may refer to: 

 Wilfred (given name), a given name and list of people (and fictional characters) with the name
 Wilfred, Indiana, an unincorporated community in the United States
 Wilfred (Australian TV series), a comedy series
 Wilfred (American TV series), a remake of the Australian series
 Operation Wilfred, a British Second World War naval operation

People with the surname
 Harmon Wilfred, stateless businessman in New Zealand
 Thomas Wilfred (1889–1968), Danish musician and inventor

See also
 Wilf
 Wilfredo
 Wilfrid ( – ), English bishop and saint
 Wilfried
 Wilford (disambiguation)